The cinnamon warbling finch (Poospiza ornata) is a species of bird in the family Thraupidae. It is endemic to Argentina.

Its natural habitats are subtropical or tropical dry forests, subtropical or tropical dry shrubland, and heavily degraded former forest.

References

cinnamon warbling finch
Endemic birds of Argentina
cinnamon warbling finch
Taxonomy articles created by Polbot